The Geely Yuanjing X1 is a mini CUV produced by Chinese manufacturer Geely slotting below the Geely Yuanjing X3. In 2020 Geely phased out the mini hatchback.

Background
As Crossovers and SUV are being more favored by Chinese people, most Chinese car manufacturers appeared their SUV projects on the market. Geely, relying its rich experience in car manufacturing, released 7 new crossover and SUV--Vision SUV, Vision X1, Vision X3, Boyue, Vision S1, Emgrand GS and Emgrand GSe.
Vision X1 is a product which divided Geely's market into more meticulous parts. At the same time, X1 made a complete "Vision" Family coexist with the "Bo" family and the "Emgrand" Family. The three families accelerate Geely's motto of "Young" and "Comprehensive".

History 
Former Geely Vision X1 was called Emgrand V01 and was published in early 2017. The Geely Yuanjing X1 was launched on the Chinese car market in May 2017. Price ranges from 39,900 yuan to 57,900 yuan. The Yuanjing X1 is based on the Geely Panda sold from 2009 to 2017.

Design
The Vision X1 carries on Geely GX2's supermini CUV car style to ingratiate the post-90s generation. The interior is more fancy. The idea of the dashboard came from surf boards. The 11.6 inches touchscreen carries Geely's X-FUN system and supports voice control, GPS and Wi-Fi. To activate it, the passenger needs to say "你好远景" (hello, vision). The multi-function steering wheel is able to activate ACC mode, switch driving modes and receive bluetooth calls. The panoramic sunroof is unique since there isn't another supermini CUV with a sunroof, however, the sunroof doesn't open. Vision X1 equips the LingLong Green-Max 175/60 R15 tires. The front axle is equipped with disc brakes and the rear with drum brakes.

References 

Crossover sport utility vehicles
City cars
Yuanjing X1
Cars introduced in 2017
Cars of China